Phrygionis paradoxata, the jeweled satyr moth or silvery phrygionis, is a moth of the family Geometridae. The species was first described by Achille Guenée in 1858. It is found in North America, including Florida. It is also known from the Bahamas, Cuba, Jamaica, Hispaniola, the Dominican Republic and Dominica.

References

Baptini